The arrondissement of Saint-Nazaire is an arrondissement of France in the Loire-Atlantique department in the Pays de la Loire region. It has 55 communes.

Composition

The communes of the arrondissement of Saint-Nazaire, and their INSEE codes, are:

 Assérac (44006)
 Batz-sur-Mer (44010)
 La Baule-Escoublac (44055)
 La Bernerie-en-Retz (44012)
 Besné (44013)
 Bouée (44019)
 Campbon (44025)
 La Chapelle-Launay (44033)
 La Chapelle-des-Marais (44030)
 Chaumes-en-Retz (44005)
 Chauvé (44038)
 Corsept (44046)
 Le Croisic (44049)
 Crossac (44050)
 Donges (44052)
 Drefféac (44053)
 Frossay (44061)
 Guenrouet (44068)
 Guérande (44069)
 Herbignac (44072)
 Lavau-sur-Loire (44080)
 Malville (44089)
 Mesquer (44097)
 Missillac (44098)
 Montoir-de-Bretagne (44103)
 Les Moutiers-en-Retz (44106)
 Paimbœuf (44116)
 Piriac-sur-Mer (44125)
 La Plaine-sur-Mer (44126)
 Pontchâteau (44129)
 Pornic (44131)
 Pornichet (44132)
 Le Pouliguen (44135)
 Préfailles (44136)
 Prinquiau (44137)
 Quilly (44139)
 Saint-André-des-Eaux (44151)
 Saint-Brevin-les-Pins (44154)
 Sainte-Anne-sur-Brivet (44152)
 Sainte-Reine-de-Bretagne (44189)
 Saint-Gildas-des-Bois (44161)
 Saint-Hilaire-de-Chaléons (44164)
 Saint-Joachim (44168)
 Saint-Lyphard (44175)
 Saint-Malo-de-Guersac (44176)
 Saint-Michel-Chef-Chef (44182)
 Saint-Molf (44183)
 Saint-Nazaire (44184)
 Saint-Père-en-Retz (44187)
 Saint-Viaud (44192)
 Savenay (44195)
 Sévérac (44196)
 Trignac (44210)
 La Turballe (44211)
 Villeneuve-en-Retz (44021)

History

The arrondissement of Savenay was created in 1800. The subprefecture was moved to Saint-Nazaire in 1868.

As a result of the reorganisation of the cantons of France which came into effect in 2015, the borders of the cantons are no longer related to the borders of the arrondissements. The cantons of the arrondissement of Saint-Nazaire were, as of January 2015:

 La Baule-Escoublac
 Bourgneuf-en-Retz
 Le Croisic
 Guérande
 Herbignac
 Montoir-de-Bretagne
 Paimboeuf
 Pontchâteau
 Pornic
 Saint-Gildas-des-Bois
 Saint-Nazaire-Centre
 Saint-Nazaire-Est
 Saint-Nazaire-Ouest
 Saint-Père-en-Retz
 Savenay

References

Saint-Nazaire